Arotrophora charopa is a species of moth of the family Tortricidae. It is found in Thailand.

The wingspan is about 11 mm. The forewings are white with pinkish suffusions and black strigulation (fine streaks) at the base of the costa, at the mid-costa and mid-dorsum. The remaining area is brownish black with bluish refractive markings. The hindwings are dark brown.

Etymology
The species name refers to the bluish-grey refractive markings of the forewings and is derived from Greek charopos (meaning bluish).

References

Moths described in 2009
Arotrophora
Moths of Asia